Twin Kiddies is a 1917 American silent comedy drama film directed by Henry King and starring Marie Osborne and Ruth Lackaye. King himself appears in a leading role.

Cast
 Marie Osborne as Bessie Hunt / Fay Van Loan 
 Henry King as Jasper Hunt 
 Ruth Lackaye as Mrs. Flannigan 
 Daniel Gilfether as William Van Loan 
 R. Henry Grey as Baxter Van Loan 
 Loretta Beecker as Beatrice Van Loan 
 Edward Jobson as Spencer 
 Mignon Le Brun as The Governess

References

Bibliography
 Donald W. McCaffrey & Christopher P. Jacobs. Guide to the Silent Years of American Cinema. Greenwood Publishing, 1999.

External links

1917 films
1917 drama films
Films directed by Henry King
American silent feature films
1910s English-language films
Pathé Exchange films
American black-and-white films
1910s American films
Silent American comedy-drama films